Shim Hyung-tak (born January 12, 1978) is a South Korean actor. He starred in Korean dramas such as The Road Home (2009), Three Sisters (2010), Welcome Rain to My Life (2012), You Are the Boss! (2013), Let's Eat (2014), Miss Mamma Mia (2015), and Touch Your Heart (2019). He is famous for Doraemon Mania.

Filmography

Television series

Film

Variety show

Music video

Musical theatre

Awards and nominations

References

External links
Shim Hyung-tak at GnG Production

1978 births
Living people
20th-century South Korean male actors
21st-century South Korean male actors
South Korean male television actors
South Korean male film actors
South Korean male musical theatre actors
Male actors from Seoul
University of Suwon alumni
Dongguk University alumni